Wilhelm Fabry (also William Fabry, Guilelmus Fabricius Hildanus, or Fabricius von Hilden) (25 June 1560 − 15 February 1634), often called the "Father of German surgery", was the first educated and scientific German surgeon. He is one of the most prominent scholars in the iatromechanics school and author of 20 medical books. His Observationum et Curationum Chirurgicarum Centuriae, published posthumously in 1641, is the best collection of case records of the century and gives clear insight into the variety and methods of his surgical practice.  He developed novel surgical techniques and new surgical instruments.  He also wrote a notable treatise on burns.  

Fabry developed a device for operating eye tumours. His wife, Marie Colinet (or Fabry), was a Swiss midwife-surgeon who improved the techniques of cesarean section delivery. She helped her husband in his surgical practice and was the first (in 1624) to use a magnet to extract metal from a patient's eye (a technique still in use today). Fabry wrote a detailed description of the procedure in his Centuriae and, although he explicitly mentioned his wife as having invented it, was given credit for the discovery. 

Fabry was born in Hilden. His birth town named the city museum (featuring surgical instruments and the like) after him, honoured him with a bronze bust in the market place, and named streets after himself and after his wife.

The city of Bern, where he died, named a street after him (Hildanusstrasse), using one of the Latin versions of his name. 

In 1579 - Badergeselle (surgeon's mate) in Düsseldorf of the extraordinary court surgeon Cosmas Slot.
On 25 July 1587 - married Marie Colinet, the daughter of Eustache Colinet, a Genevese printer.
1602 - 1615 Surgeon in Payerne (Switzerland) and Lausanne.
1615 - 1634 City Surgeon in Bern by appointment of the city council

Works
 De Dysenteria : Liber unus: In quo hujus Morbi Causae, Signa, Prognostica, & Praeservatio continentur: Item, quomodo Symptomata, quae huic Morbo supervenire solent, sint removenda . de Bry / Galler, Oppenheimii 1616 Digital edition by the University and State Library Düsseldorf

References

Resources 
 Georg Becker, Wilhelm Fabry von Hilden (Niederbergische Beiträge vol. 6, ed. Heinrich Strangmeier), Wuppertal 1957 (German)
 
 

1560 births
1634 deaths
German surgeons
16th-century German physicians
17th-century German physicians
16th-century surgeons
17th-century surgeons
17th-century German writers
17th-century German male writers